Sati Beg ( 1316–1345) was an Ilkhanid princess, the sister of Il-Khan Abu Sa'id (r. 1316–1333). She was the consort of amir Chupan (1319–1327), Il-Khan Arpa (r. 1335–36), and Il-Khan Suleiman (r. 1339–1343). In 1338–39, she was briefly the Ilkhanid khatun (queen regnant) during internal conflicts (and fragmentation), appointed by a Chobanid faction led by Hassan Kuchak.

Life
She was born as daughter of Öljaitü and his Khongirad wife Eltuzmish Khatun. Upon her brother's accession in 1316, Sati Beg was betrothed to the amir Chupan, one of the most powerful individuals in the Ilkhanid court. They were wed on 6 September 1319; their marriage produced a son, Surgan. When Chupan and Abu Sa'id came into conflict in 1327, Sati Beg was returned to the Ilkhan. Chupan was executed that same year at Abu Sa'id's insistence; Sati Beg and Surgan were spared.

Reign
Following Abu Sa'id's death in 1335, the Ilkhanate began to disintegrate. By 1336, Sati Beg and Surgan had taken the side of Arpa Ke'un, Sati Beg herself marrying him. However, after his death, they joined forces with the founder of the Jalayirid dynasty, Hasan Buzurg. After the latter seized control of western Persia, Surgan was made governor of Karabakh (in modern Azerbaijan), where he and his mother moved to. However, when a grandson of Chupan, Hasan Kucek, defeated Hasan Buzurg in July 1338, Sati Beg and Surgan defected to his camp. Taking advantage of her family ties, Hasan Kucek raised her to the Ilkhanid throne in July or August of that year. Her viziers were also from famous families in Iran. Her nominal authority did not extend beyond the Chobanid domains of northwestern Persia.

Hasan Buzurg, who still controlled southwestern Persia and Iraq, requested the assistance of another claimant of the Ilkhanid throne named Togha Temur. The latter invaded the Chobanid lands in early 1339. Hasan Kucek, however, promised Sati Beg's hand in marriage to him in exchange for an alliance. This proved, however, to be a ruse; the intent was merely to alienate Hasan Buzurg from Togha Temur. The Jalayirids withdrew their support, and Togha Temur was forced to retreat without gaining Sati Beg. Meanwhile, Hasan Kucek was growing suspicious of Sati Beg and her son. Realizing that she was too valuable to be removed completely, he deposed her and then forced her to marry his new candidate for the throne, Suleiman Khan.

Later life
Hasan Kucek was murdered late in 1343; Sati Beg's son Surgan found himself competing for control of the Chobanid lands with the late ruler's brother Malek Asraf and his uncle Yagi Basti. When he was defeated by Malek Asraf, he fled to his mother and stepfather. The three of them then formed an alliance, but when Hasan Buzurg decided to withdraw the support he promised, the plan fell apart, and they fled to Diyarbakr. Surgan was defeated again in 1345 by Malek Asraf and they fled to Anatolia. Coinage dating from 1342/1343 in Hesn Kayfa and Arzan (in Georgia) (dated 1345) in Sati Beg's name; this is the last trace of her. Surgan moved from Anatolia to Baghdad, where he was eventually executed by Hasan Buzurg; Sati Beg may have suffered the same fate, but this is unknown.

References

Sources 

Charles Melville and 'Abbas Zaryab. "Chobanids." Encyclopedia Iranica. URL: http://www.iranica.com/articles/search/searchpdf.isc?ReqStrPDFPath=/home1/iranica/articles/v5_articles/chobanids&OptStrLogFile=/home/iranica/public_html/logs/pdfdownload.html
Peter Jackson (1986). The Cambridge History of Iran, Volume Six: The Timurid and Safavid Periods. 
Women in power (1300-1350)

Il-Khan emperors
14th-century monarchs in Asia
14th-century women rulers
14th-century deaths